The Western Suburbs Magpies (legal name: Western Suburbs District Rugby League Football Club Ltd) are an Australian rugby league football club based in the western suburbs of Sydney, New South Wales. Formed in 1908, Wests, as they are commonly referred to, were one of the nine foundation clubs of the first New South Wales Rugby League competition in Australia. The club, as a sole entity, departed the top-flight competition in 1999 after forming a 50–50 joint venture with Balmain Tigers to form the Wests Tigers. The club currently fields sides in the NSW State Cup (Canterbury Cup), Ron Massey Cup (Opens), S.G. Ball Cup (Under 18's) and Harold Matthews Cup (Under 16's) competitions.

Campbelltown Stadium, which has a capacity of 18,000, is their home stadium.

History
The club was one of the foundation members of the Sydney rugby football league competition in 1908. Founded at a meeting on 4 February 1908 at Ashfield Town Hall, they won only one match the following season so were the League's second wooden spooners (after Cumberland in 1908). Though they spent long periods of time as also-rans they did taste premiership success four times in the mid 20th century. They won their first premiership in 1930, beating St George 27–2. Four years later they defeated Eastern Suburbs to win their second title. For the 1944 NSWRFL season Queensland 1910s representative player Henry Bolewski became coach the Western Suburbs club, replacing Alf Blair, who moved to South Sydney. Wests improved slightly on the previous season, finishing 5th (out of 8), but failing to make the finals, and Bolewski was replaced by club great, Frank McMillan.

Wests won a second pair of premierships, beating Balmain in 1948 and South Sydney 22–12 in 1952. Both times they defeated a club hunting its third title in a row.

1960s
Apart from these occasions, the club was famous for three successive grand final matches in 1961, 1962 and 1963 against the St George Dragons in the midst of their 11-premiership run. The club boasted footballers such as halfback Arthur Summons, Harry 'Bomber' Wells, Kel O'Shea, Noel Kelly and Peter Dimond. The 1963 grand final was immortalised in a photograph which became known as 'The Gladiators' after St. George captain Norm Provan and Summons trudged off the field together.

1970s
A final period of glory beckoned in the late 1970s where they spent a few years at the top or near-top of the table, yet failed to make a grand final. Coached by Roy Masters and boasting such players as fullback John Dorahy, half Tommy Raudonikis, five-eighth Graeme O'Grady, Gavin Miller, Ron Giteau, Les Boyd, prop John Donnelly and five-eighth Terry Lamb. However attractive offers from other clubs and then doubts about the club's viability led to years of exodus of talent. Wests did manage to win the 1977 Amco Cup.

1980s

John Ribot, a winger for Wests, was the top try-scorer for the 1980 season. In 1983 the NSWRFL attempted to expel Wests from the competition, but a prolonged legal battle to keep their spot ensued, unlike the Newtown Jets who did not compete that year. Richard Conti appeared against New South Wales Rugby League bosses John Quayle and Colin Love in 1985, successfully advocating to keep the embattled club in the competition. He was later appointed the chairman of the NSWRL Judiciary.

Eventually, Wests relocated to Campbelltown in 1987. Ironically, this was where Newtown had unsuccessfully tried to move to four years earlier.

1990s
Wests began a rebuilding process in the late 1980s and early 1990s. Laurie Freier started the 1988 Winfield Cup season as the club's coach but was replaced during the season by John Bailey.

The club made the semi-finals in 1991 and 1992 under coach Warren Ryan. Wests were NSWRL Club Champions in 1991 when all three grades made the semi-finals. The team also made it to the pre-season Challenge Cup final in 1993 but was beaten by a star-studded Canberra side.

The club then slipped down the ladder and the coaching reins were handed over to caretaker Wayne Ellis.
The decision to appoint Tommy Raudonikis as coach for the start of the 1995 season sent a shot of adrenaline into the club. Raudonikis took the Magpies to the finals in 1996. However the club could not compete in the player market in 1997 thanks to the Super League war which saw players' contracts soar sky high to unsustainable levels.

In 1998 and 1999, a Magpie team filled with many unknown players struggled to be competitive and twice received the wooden spoon. With the club struggling on-field and trying to compete financially against clubs with News Limited funding, the writing was on the wall.

Joint venture
The well documented Super League War in 1997 between Super League (News Ltd) and the Australian Rugby League (ARL) resulted in a compromise that by the year 2000, the National Rugby League (NRL) competition would be contested by only 14 teams. With Western Suburbs struggling on field in the NRL competition, it was decided by the club in the middle of 1999 that to survive the cull they would be required to merge their senior team with another club's team. After initial talks with the Canterbury-Bankstown Bulldogs failed an agreement was reached with the Balmain Tigers on 27 July 1999. The Wests Tigers first competed in the 2000 competition. The club also merged its playing colours from the two joint venture partners.

Major sponsors
 Allied Express
 Victa (1978–1982)
 IPEC Couriers (1984–1985)
 Masterton Homes (1986–1992)
 Goldstar / LG Electronics (1995–1997)
 Signature Security Systems (1998–1999)
 Club Hotels (2000)
 Save Home loans (2005)
 Wests Ashfield Leagues (2006–2015)

Wests Ashfield Leagues have also been key sponsors & supporters of the club since they were established.
 Rebel Sport (Centenary Partner and 2008 Major Sponsor)
 Allied Express (2015)

Current days
The Western Suburbs Magpies home matches are played at Lidcombe Oval, Lidcombe and their training facilities are near by.  

In 2000 the Western Suburbs Magpies Under 20s team were runners up to the Canterbury Bankstown Bulldogs, captained by Mitch Zammit and Luke Duffy. The Western Suburbs Magpies last title was won in 2002 when the Western Suburbs Magpies captained by Liam Fulton won the New South Wales Rugby League Under 18's competition.

From 2000 to 2012 the Western Suburbs Magpies fielded teams in the NSWRL First Grade competition now known as the NSW Cup.

In 2006 the Wests Tigers on advice from Tim Sheens pushed the notion that the NRL side would be better served with a single NSW Cup side. Western Suburbs board opposed this decision and decided to continue fielding their own team. Wests Tigers then allocated all NRL contracted players to the Balmain Tigers (the Wests Magpies had six junior players in that group, as opposed to one from Balmain), citing the advantages of both the NRL and NSW Cup teams training together at Concord Oval. This continued from 2006 to 2007.

Magpies chairman Kevin Hammond was disappointed at the Wests Tigers decision and informed the Wests Tigers of that in 2008, if the Magpies did not receive a fair share of player allocation from the Wests Tigers, they would form a feeder partnership with rivals Canberra Raiders. The Wests Tigers capitulated.

The Western Suburbs Magpies made the semi-finals in 2008, 2009 and 2010. In 2012 funding was withheld from the Magpies by Wests Ashfield Leagues Club Directors (not unanimously) as they now supported Wests Tigers proposal for a single NSW Cup side, even though this was done simply because Balmain couldn't afford a side and Wests could.

This also went against the Magpies Football Club members wishes and they organised a Protest Rally through the streets of Campbelltown. Wests Ashfield Leagues Club under pressure reinstated funding late in the off season after the Magpies players had already signed on to play with other teams.

The Wests Tigers however decided to cease all support of the Magpies NSW Cup side while continuing support for Balmain Ryde Eastwood Tigers. The Magpies failed to win a game in 2012 while Balmain Ryde Eastwood Tigers made it to the Grand Final where they were defeated by the Newtown Jets.

The Magpies dropped back to the third tier Ron Massey Cup in 2013, with members voting to field a separate NSW Cup team in 2014, although this did not eventuate.
In 2015 the Magpies added a team in the Sydney Shield competition to act as a feeder for their Ron Massey Cup campaign. In 2016, Western Suburbs made the preliminary final match against St Mary's in The Ron Massey Cup but lost the match in a close tussle.

2017 proved to be a bad year for Wests as The Ron Massey Cup side finished with the wooden spoon and The Sydney Shield side finished second last.

On 5 June 2017, it was announced that Western Suburbs had placed a bid to be included into the Intrust Super Premiership season for 2018.

The re-entry to the Intrust Super Premiership ends the clubs 5-year hiatus from the top level NSWRL competition that it had participated continuously in from 1908 to 2012. For its return the team will be coached by former Western Suburbs 1st grade player Brett Hodgson.
In 2018, Wests enjoyed a solid return to the Intrust Super Premiership NSW after finishing in 5th place on the table.  In week 1 of the finals, Wests were defeated by the Wyong Roos 18-14 in the elimination final thus ending their season.

At the end of the 2019 Canterbury Cup NSW season, Western Suburbs missed out on the finals after finishing in 10th place. Western Suburbs had a difficult year during the 2022 NSW Cup finishing 11th on the table just one spot above wooden spooners Blacktown Workers.

Home grounds
St Luke's Park was the home ground of the Western Suburbs club in 1910 and 1911. They started playing their matches at Pratten Park in Ashfield in 1912, but after pressure from local residents there the council refused the club permission to use that ground, forcing them to return to St. Luke's Oval from 1915 to 1919.
The Magpies have played at three home grounds since foundation. They returned to Pratten Park in 1920, remaining there until 1966, the club then played at Pratten Park sporadically over the next two decades playing games there in 1971, 1972, 1973, 1977 and 1985.  The final ever first grade game to be played at Pratten Park was on 18 August 1985 against Penrith, Penrith won the match by 42–16. They then moved to Lidcombe Oval in 1967. This was due to Ashfield council not allowing the club to play matches on a Sunday (as this was the church day). In 1987, they moved to Campbelltown's Orana Park (located in adjacent Leumeah), which, after a $25 million renovation, is now called Campbelltown Stadium which is now one of the home grounds of the Wests Tigers. The Magpies' lower grade sides play most home games at Campbelltown Stadium, with the occasional game moved to Lidcombe Oval.

Western Suburbs Magpies Leagues Club
While no leagues club is called the "Western Suburbs Magpies Leagues Club", the businesses "Western Suburbs District Rugby League Football Club Ltd" is a fully controlled entity of Wests Ashfield Leagues Club. The Leagues club was formed in the 1950s and is now one of the leading community Clubs in Sydney.

Board of Directors

The current board of directors of the Wests Magpies (Western Suburbs District Rubgy League Football Club)

 Rick Wayde (Chairman) - WAL Appointed
 Julie Romero (Deputy Chair) - WAL Appointed
 Tony Andreacchio - WAL Appointed
 Vince Tropiano - WAL Appointed
 Shannon Cavanagh - FC Member Elected
 Allan Fallah - FC Member Elected
 Tony Westlake - FC Member Elected

The board of directors comprises 4 members appointed by Wests Ashfield Leagues Club, and 3 members elected by the members of the football club

District Junior competition

The Western Suburbs District Junior Rugby League (WSDJRL) was a completely separate entity to the Western Suburbs Magpies DRLFC. They were known as the "Junior Magpies", and administered the junior rugby league on behalf of the Western Suburbs Magpies and the Wests Tigers joint venture. It consisted of a network of affiliated junior rugby league clubs throughout the greater Campbelltown and Liverpool areas of southwestern Sydney. As of 2016 the following clubs were involved in the WSDJRL;
 All Saints JRLFC
 All Stars Glenquarie (formally Macquarie fields hawks)
 Campbelltown City Kangaroos JRLFC
 Campbelltown Collegians JRLFC
 Campbelltown Warriors JRLFC
 Eaglevale St Andrews JRLFC
 East Campbelltown Eagles JRLFC
 Hinchinbrook Hornets JRLFC
 Ingleburn RSL Tigers JRLFC
 Liverpool Catholic Club Raiders JRLFC
 Macarthur Saints JRLFC (ex- St Thomas More JRLFC)
 Minto Cobras JRLFC
 Valley United Vikings JRLFC(formally known as East Valley United and also Green Valley United)

The league was placed into administration in January 2019, with the NSWRL stepping in to manage the competition.

The following clubs also competed in the WSDJRL, but have now folded:
 Airds Colts JRLFC
 Ashcroft JRLFC
 Claymore Panthers JRLFC
 Dayments Dolphins JRLFC
 Heckenberg JRLFC
 Ingleburn Bulldogs JRLFC
 Leumeah Wolves JRLFC
 Liverpool City JRLFC
 Liverpool Titans JRLFC
 Liverpool RSL JRLFC
 Macquarie Cobras JRLFC
 Warwick Farm JRLFC
 Woodlands JRLFC
 Sadlier Bulldogs JRLFC

The WSDJRL has produced many ex and current Wests Tigers players including Brett Hodgson (Eagle Vale-St Andrews & Ingleburn RSL), Dean Collis (Campbelltown Warriors), Bryce Gibbs (All Saints Liverpool), Shannon Gallant (All Saints Liverpool & Campbelltown City) Chris Lawrence (Eagle Vale), and Shannon McDonnell (All Saints Liverpool). David Noaofaluma (Campbelltown Warriors, Campbelltown Collegians) James Tedesco (Eagle Vale St. Andrews) also Camden Rams (group 6, CRL) Other notable NRL players who grew up playing junior rugby league in the WSDJRL are Anthony Minichiello (East Valley United), Mark Minichiello (Liverpool Catholic Club) Frank Pritchard (Campbelltown City)Eric Grothe, Jr. (Eagle Vale), Ryan Hoffman (Campbelltown Collegians), Ben Roberts (Narellan Jets), Sauaso Sue (Macquarie Field Hawks), Israel Folau, Jarryd Hayne, Krisnan Inu, Michael Lett (Ingleburn RSL), Gray Viane, John Skandalis, Ken McGuinness, Kevin McGuinness, Tim Lafai and Mickey & Lopini Paea (all Minto Cobras).

The WSDJRL took over its current boundaries from the CRL Group 6 Northern Junior League and parts of the Parramatta DJRL (i.e. Liverpool) in 1987. They were forced to move out of their traditional territory around the Ashfield and Lidcombe areas of inner western Sydney to be able to then survive in the NSWRL. The old WSDJRL area has since been acquired by the Balmain DJRL and Bulldogs (Canterbury) DJRL. Clubs that used to play in the WSDJRL include;
 Ashfield Colts (now folded) – Also known as the Ashfield Kings
  Burwood United (now merged with Concord in Balmain DJRL)
  Concord United (now merged with Burwood in Balmain DJRL)
  Benedicts Auburn (now Trinity College, Auburn)
  Enfield Federals (When the Magpies first went to Campbelltown they became part of Canterbury, then they folded for a few years before coming in under the Balmain DJRL) (produced Hazem El Masri, Robbie Farah, Scott Gale, Brett Clark, Wayne Smith, Ken Hey, Jim Serdaris, Denis Pittard, Tim Pickup and Brett Gale Leo Epifania)
  Five Dock JRLFC (now in Balmain DJRL)
  Lidcombe Bulls (folded in mid-1980s)
  Berala Bears (now in Bulldogs DJRL)
  Croydon Park (folded in mid-1980s)
  Holman JRLFC (Named after Keith Holman, based at Henley Park, Enfield. Colours were yellow with a blue shoulder saddle, and the emblem was oval shaped with a kangaroo, a football, a kiwi, a rooster & a lion ; signifying that Keith played for Australia against New Zealand, France & England. Folded in mid-1980s)
 Homebush – unsure when folded
  Royal Sheaf Hotel (Burwood, folded in late 1980s)
 Oriental Shamrocks (folded in 1960s)
 Granville Diggers – folded in mid 80s
 De La Salle – Ashfield – again, unsure of when they folded
 Christian Brothers Burwood
 Auburn United – unsure when folded
 Strathfield – unsure when folded

The first year of the WSDJRL was 1910 and the final standings were: Parramatta Iona 16, Parramatta District 14, Campsie Triers 11, Granville Royals 11, Enfield Mercantile 9, Ashfield Surryville 7, Auburn Park 2. Since the NSWRL had promised 2 sets of medals the teams then split into 2 grades, Campsie Triers beating Granville Royals in a playoff to go onto the A section and the other 4 teams in the B Finals. Parramatta District won the A Grade and Granville Royals the B Grade. Parramatta District went into the NSWRL 3rd Grade competition in 1911 and Granville Royals joined them in 1912. Campsie Triers and Enfield Mercantile were formed by a split in the Enfield Federals club that had won the B Grade of the WSJRU competition in 1909, in its first year as a club. Val Howell, Frank Howell, S Gagan, G Gagan, A Tanner and Thompson joined Campsie while Lewis, H McCoy, D Nicholls, Prentice and Smythe joined Mercantile. They were together as the Feds in 1911 and won both that season and again in 1912, so without the split they might have won titles in each of their first 4 seasons.

Notable players

Hall of Fame
On Friday 30 May 2008 the centenary of the Western Suburbs Magpies was celebrated with a ball in the Grand Harbour Ballroom at Sydney's Star City Casino. Six inaugural members were also inducted into the Western Suburbs Magpies Hall of Fame:
 Keith Holman
 Jim Abercrombie
 Peter Dimond
 Arthur Summons
 Tommy Raudonikis
 Noel Kelly

2010 Inductees
 Dick Vest
 Bill Keato
 Trevor Cogger
1997 MIA players
 Wayne Shields

2012 Inductees
 Clarrie Prentice
 Frank Stanmore
 Wayne Smith

Team of the Century

In 2004 the club named its Team of the Century:

International Representatives

The following Western Suburbs Magpies players have represented their countries in international competition.

 Australia
 Frank McMillan
 Bill Brogan
 Alan Ridley
 Vic Hey
 Dick Vest
 Keith Holman
 Arthur Summons
 Peter Dimond
 Don Parish
 Harry Wells
 Kel O'Shea
 Noel Kelly
 John Ribot
 Terry Lamb
 Paul Langmack
 David Gillespie
 Tommy Raudonikis
 Jim Serdaris
 Les Boyd
 John Donnelly

 New Zealand
 Mark Horo
 Stephen Kearney
 Brendon Tuuta

 England
 Harvey Howard
 Lee Crooks
 Garry Schofield
 Ellery Hanley

  Ireland
 Shayne McMenemy

  Fiji
 Netane Masima

  Papua New Guinea
 David Buko

Magpies Test Captains
 Herb Gilbert – 1920
 Frank McMillan – 1933 to 1934
 Col Maxwell – 1948 to 1949
 Arthur Summons – 1963 to 1964
 Tommy Raudonikis – 1973

Coaching register

Records

Club honours
 Premierships: 4 – 1930 beat St George; 1934 beat Easts; 1948 beat Balmain; 1952 beat South Sydney
 Runners Up: 8 – 1918; 1925; 1932; 1950; 1958; 1961; 1962; 1963
 Minor Premierships: 5 – 1930; 1948; 1952; 1961; 1978
 Amco Cup: 1 – 1977
 City Cup: 2 – 1918; 1919

Youth/Pre-season honours
 NSWRL Club Championships: 4 – 1948; 1960; 1961; 1991
 State Cup / Jersey Flegg U20s: 1 – 1965
 Ampol Cup: 1 – 1963
NSWRL Reserve Grade: 3 (1936, 1961, 1981)
NSWRL Third Grade: 7 (1936, 1938, 1939, 1944, 1958, 1961, 1967)
Under 23 Premiership: 1 (1977)
President's Cup: 1 (1925, 1947, 1958, 1992)
Flegg Memorial Trophy: 2 (1961, 1981)
NSWRL SG Ball U18's: 2 (1971, 2002)

Largest crowd:
 Lidcombe Oval: 21,015 vs Parramatta (30 July 1978)
 Campbelltown Sports Ground: 17,286 vs St George (2 August 1991)
 Pratten Park: 12,407 vs St George (15 June 1964)

Biggest defeat:
67 – 0 vs South Sydney (Agricultural Showground, 23 July 1910)

Biggest win:
62 -5 vs Balmain (Lidcombe Oval, 31 March 1974)

Individual

Most First Grade Games
 201 – Tommy Raudonikis (1969–1979)
 200 – Keith Holman (1949–1961)
 161 – Tedda Courtney (1909, 1911–1924)
 161 – Wayne Smith (1976–1984)
 160 – Trevor Cogger (1981–1991)
 155 – Peter Dimond (1958–1967)
 148 – John Donnelly (1975–1984)
 148 – Steve Georgallis (1993–1999)
 144 – Darren Willis (1992–1998)
 143 – Nev Charlton (1954-1961)
 141 – Frank McMillan (1921–1924, 1926–1935)

Most Tries in a Match:
Alan Ridley, 6 vs Newtown, Pratten Park, 11 July 1936

Most Tries in a Season:
Alan Ridley, 18 in 1932 and Paul Smith, 18 in 1994

Most 1st Grade Tries For Club:
Peter Dimond, 83

Most Tries For Club (All grades):
Trevor Cogger, 88

Most Goals in a Match:
Les Mead, 12 v Canterbury, Pratten Park, 31 August 1935

Most Points in a Match:
Les Mead, 27 ( 1 try, 12 goals ) v Canterbury, Pratten Park, 31 August 1935

Most Points in a Season:
Peter Rowles, 215 ( 8 tries, 94 goals, 3 field goals ) in 1978

Most Points for Club:
Bill Keato, 776 ( 6 tries, 379 goals )

All Time 1st Grade Numbered Players List

Below is a list of all players that played for the Western Suburbs Magpies in the NSWRL, ARL and NRL First Grade competitions from 1908 to 1999.

 1908
1 Jim Abercrombie
2 C Blake
3 A Brown
4 George Duffin 
5 B Duggan
6 Bill Elliott
7 Percy Franks
8 L Gormley
9 Ray Gormley
10 Ted Mead
11 T Mount
12 Tom Phelan
13 Jim Stack
14 Les Byewell
15 R Ellis
16 Charles Luhr
17 T Watkins
18 E Ellis
19 Boyleau
20 Claude McFayden
21 N Booth
22 Charlie Elliott
23 J Frost
24 J Hodgson
25 S Gilbert
26 Holloway
27 J Herrington 
 1909
28 A Abbott
29 Harry Bloomfield
30 F Casey
31 Albert Halling
32 R Meredith
33 J Spears
34 T Wallis
35 H Boyle
36 Edward Bellamy
37 Albert Burdus
38 Tedda Courtney
39 S Duncan
40 Bill Medcalf
41 V Sands
42 C Blake
43 E Gulliver
44 E Fletcher
45 G Shaw
46 W Wenban
47 C Clifford
48 P Scotten
49 R McCallum
50 Harold R. Thompson
51 H Kemp
52 W Moore
53 William Thrussell
54 W Wright
 1910
55 W Barclay
56 Percy Bolt
57 T Doyle
58 J Feeney
59 V Jarvis
60 E Mantle
61 H.G. Naylor
62 E Palmer
63 E Willings
64 Grinstead
65 Owens
66 Sam Perry
67 Keen
68 James
69 Percy Briscoe
70 Chipperfield
71 J Ogilvie
72 Horace Alderson
73 Johns
74 J Slingsby
75 D McDonald
76 G Patterson
77 Baldock
78 Tom Dowswell
79 Healy
80 McEvoy
81 Ryan
 1911
82 George Duffin
83 Herb Gilbert
84 Rangi Joass
85 W Mueller
86 A Munnery
87 P.J. Thompson
88 Jack Tully
89 S.B. Wall
90 A Gillett
91 Alf Joass
92 Dick Moroney
93 V West
94 Oliver Griffin
95 A Paterson
96 A Stack
 1912
97 Tom Alpen
98 Harold Bissett
99 S Dennis
100 E.S Williams
101 Arthur Conlin
102 G Holt
103 George Alderson
104 Thackeray
105 Stuart
106 B Webster
107 Ray Steward
108 Bertram Alderson
109 W Gander
110 G Easterbrook
111 Hearn
112 C Lucky
113 Cecil Foord
114 Charles Rothwell
 1913
115 S Carr
116 W Foord
117 Eddie Griffiths
118 J Lindsay
119 Johnno Stuntz
120 George Gagen
121 V Masters
122 Harry Clarke
123 L West
124 Henry McIllmurray
125 A Rose
126 Fred Lane
127 Maxworthy
128 W Warby
129 J Freeman
130 H Sly
131 W Weigan
132 Harrington
 1914
133 W Anderton
134 Charlie Collier
135 Jack Nicholson
136 R Tremain
137 Clarrie Tye
138 E Mason
139 D Watson
140 N Williams
141 R Upton
142 F Holt
143 Dick Vest
 1915
144 Harold Leddy
145 Tom McCauley
146 A Mitchell
147 Archie Prentice
148 Clarrie Prentice
149 W.L. Simpson
150 A Smith
151 Athol White
152 Billy Connelly
153 Alf Bossi
154 G Hastle
155 G Viles
156 D Woodward
 1916
157 A McPherson
158 Roy Norman
159 A Carroll
160 H Lee
161 S Langley
162 F Large
163 R Swanson
164 E Johnson
 1917
165 P Burns
166 George Potter
167 Jack Redmond
168 Ted Boland
169 Charles Ashworth
170 Harold Holmes
171 Roy Bossi
172 S.D. Matthews
173 Joe Reidy
 1918
174 Wally Collins
175 Albert Johnston
176 Walter Palmer
 1919
177 George McGowan
178 W Matthews
179 Patrick McCue
180 Bill Lucas
181 Roy Farnsworth
182 Gordon Stettler
 1920
183 Viv Farnsworth
184 Ward Prentice
185 Lyall Wall
186 Harry Tancred
187 Frank Gray
188 G Bossi
 1921
189 Edward Burnicle
190 Frank McMillan
191 Eric Doig
192 R Howell
193 J Plumb
194 E Stapleton
195 Frank Burridge
196 J Ryan
197 R Walker
 1922
198 Tedda Brooks
199 H Haylock
200 Louis Yanz
201 F Young
202 J Drew
203 Fred Yanz Sr.
204 Wade Lane
205 R Dark
206 Neil Matterson
207 J Walker
208 Cyril Bellamy
209 Arthur Mendel
 1923
210 Cec Fifield
211 W McCabe
212 Bob Lindfield
213 Bill Carpenter
214 Jerry Brien
 1924
215 Joe Mansted
216 F Elliott
217 Ed Courtney Jr.
218 Frank Matterson
219 Frank McCauley
220 R Ives
 1925
221 George Daisley
222 Gilbert C
 1926
223 Flint C
224 Jim Parsons
225 Tony Redmond
226 C Stapleton
227 Frank Spillane
228 Jack Holmes
229 G Peterson
230 Harry Owen
231 Roy Liston
232 R Wheldon
233 Cecil Rhodes
234 Dave Hey
 1927
235 Les Dolan
236 Les Hayes
237 Ken Sherwood
238 G Cameron
239 F Bartley
240 W McPherson
241 George Mason
242 Harry Tisdale
243 Ray Morris
244 Tom Stanton
245 Jack Thompson
 1928
246 Allan Adams
247 Leo Joyce
248 Walter Anderton
249 Jack Matterson
250 Jack Peterson
251 J McKee
252 Frank Boyd
253 Jack Kelly
254 H Miller

 1929
255 Alan Brady
256 William Brogan
257 Jim Craig
258 N McNee
259 L Roberts
260 N Booth
261 Cliff Pearce
262 Vince Dwyer
 1930
263 Norm Johnson
264 Les Mead
265 Charlie Cornwell
266 Harold Rigby
267 Jack Rosa
268 Vince Hughes
 1931
269 Bert Green
270 Alan Ridley
271 Cec Anderton
272 Harry Cameron
273 Bill Ryan
274 Dick Davis
275 Charlie Wrench
276 Clyde Cant
 1932
277 R McMillan
278 Jack McGlinn
279 Frank Sponberg
280 H Rankine
 1933
281 Vic Hey
282 R Shepherd
283 Stan Tancred
284 Jack McDonell
285 Les Midson
286 W McLeod
287 Sid Elliott
288 Bill Howes
289 Alan Blake
290 S Palmer
291 Sen Black
292 Tom Magnus
293 Albert McGuinness
294 L Hancock
295 Cliff Deegan
296 M Smith
 1934
297 Max Gray
298 Ray Hancock
299 Vince Sheehan
300 George Sherry
301 Ray Hines
302 Jack Hartwell Sr.
303 Alec McDonald
304 Jimmy Sharman
305 Lionel Frappell
306 Don Murray
 1935
307 Ron Eaton
308 Jack Kingston
309 Gordon Pugh
310 Athol Smith
311 Vince Cleary
312 Bob Allison
313 Jack Spillane
314 Fred Comber
315 Billy Wheeler
316 H Hannan
317 Bill Purcell
318 R Waldon
 1936
319 Ray Gillam
320 Mick Shields
321 Pat White
322 Jack Arnold
323 Stan Simpson
324 Edward Mewton
325 Andy Gleeson
326 Doug Wilson
 1937
327 Don Gulliver
328 Herbert Haar
329 Jack Knox
330 E Murphy
331 Ken Lock
332 Jack Schuback
 1938
333 Fred Baber
334 Lew Fisher
335 G Lucas
336 James Marks
337 E Martin
338 Colin Fewtrell
339 Jack Rubinson
340 Phil Cooper
341 Bill Keato
 1939
342 Fred McKean
343 O Mitchell
344 Dave Colless
345 Ron Ackling
346 R Campbell
347 Ken Kelly
348 H Allen
349 J Tisdale
350 John Caffrey
351 Harry Martin
 1940
352 Bruce Brown
353 A Patrick
354 Jack Whitehurst
355 Doug Rogers
356 Jack Farrell
357 J Grahame
358 R Ridley
 1941
359 J Huxley
360 N Parkinson
361 Jim Rutherford
362 T Slattery
363 Bob Thompson
364 Eric Bennett
365 C O'Brien
366 C Sherry
 1942
367 Harry Grew
368 L Hoshcke
369 Neville Spence
370 W Taylor
371 C Williams
372 R Hill
373 William Brown
374 Terry Edwards
375 R McLaurin
376 J Wilson
377 A Rice
378 R Thompson
379 J Fawkner
380 Billy Morris
381 J Hope
382 E Edwards
383 T Grew
384 L Rigby
385 J Beckett
 1943
386 Begley J
387 Arthur Clues
388 S Eisenhuth
389 Dick Johnson
390 Bob Andrews
391 B Dawson
392 Alan Keato
393 R Fields
394 Jack Snare
395 K Ibbett
396 Fred Fayers
397 P McFarlane
398 Jack Russell
399 Ron Martin
 1944
400 S Ball
401 H Fyvie
402 Jim Keefe
403 Don Milton
404 Cliff Peime
405 W Phillips
406 Alf Cardy
407 Neville Hogan
408 Fred Yanz Jr.
409 J Banner
410 A Seamer
411 Paddy Bugden
412 L Clancy
413 R Davidson
414 Robert Magill
 1945
415 Frank Dodson
416 Jim Nicholson
417 Jim Seery
418 Jack Walsh
419 Col Maxwell
420 R Dreves
421 R Williams
 1946
422 Tom Briggs
423 J Hickey
424 Bob Hobbs
425 Lindsay Rodda
426 S Cruise
427 Dick McKelvey
428 K Cleary
429 Pat Leal
 1947
430 Trevor Eather
431 Kevein Hansen
432 John Lackey
433 Peter McLean
434 Mick Thornton
 1948
435 Bernie Purcell
436 Frank Stanmore
437 Alan Hornery
438 Wally Tebbutt
439 Bill Horder
440 Keith Holman
441 Col Hudson
442 Don Worne
 1949
443 Jack Woods
444 George Bain
445 Bill Rawlinson
446 Jack Fitzgerald
447 G Lovell
448 Jack Williams
449 Vic Williams
450 Bill Hilliard
451 Jack Wall
452 Jack Rawlinson
 1950
453 Bill Randall
454 Dev Dines
455 Ron Watson
456 Bobby Dimond
457 Leo Trevena
458 Dudley Beger
459 Don Stait
 1951
460 Arthur Collinson
461 Peter Long
462 Keith Cullen
463 Jack Rudd
464 Keith Deacon
465 Hec Farrell
466 Eddie Hooper
467 K Muddell
 1952
468 Bill Callinan
469 Gerry Lowe
470 Col Ratcliff
471 Don Schofield
472 Bede Goff
473 R Smith
474 F Mullens
475 Jack Dickerson
 1953
476 W Smith
477 Ernie Church
478 Mick Carrig
479 Jim McKenzie
480 Bob Sargent
481 Keith Lennard
482 Brian Ogle
483 Max Caldwell
484 Dale Puren
485 Barry Owens
486 Reg Southam
487 Peter Wooden
488 Ted Brennan
 1954
489 Neville Charlton
490 Don Graham
491 Bill Owens
492 Doug Smith
493 Johnny Thompson
494 W Lowe
495 Kevin Owens
496 E Burnett
497 Jim Fleming
498 Bob Tucker
499 Jack Gibson
500 Bill Carson
501 John Harrison
502 E Wynn
503 M Godfrey
504 J Leslie
505 Bill Brown
506 Pat Toohey

 1955
507 Bill Bailey
508 John Brest
509 Don Collier
510 Pat Hyde
511 Jack Plater
512 Dick Murphy
513 P Williamson
514 Noel Trevena
515 K Thompson
516 Monty Porter
517 Geoff Jurd
 1956
518 Darcy Henry
519 Ernie Hills
520 Ian Johnston
521 Don Meehan
522 Kel O'Shea
523 Mark Patch
524 Cliff Smailes
525 Harry Wells
526 Pat Daley
527 Noel Hurley
528 Ray Aldrich
529 Fred Delaney
530 Peter Hargreaves
 1957
531 Doug Hambilton
532 Darcy Russell
533 Brian Shannon
534 Ron Sudlow
535 Les Midson
536 Doug Harrison
537 Ernie Johnson
538 Brian Isaacs
 1958
539 Buddy Bowman
540 Peter Dimond
541 Rees Duncan
542 Doug Jones
543 Jack Mantle
544 Don Malone
545 Bernie Kelly
546 Colin Wells
547 Fred Graber
548 John Dawson
 1959
549 Ian Moir
550 John Taunton
551 Ray McDermott
552 John Mowbray
553 Dick Poole
554 Frank Clegg
555 John Conna
556 George Downie
557 Dave Barsley
558 Roger Buttenshaw
559 Joe Ryan
 1960
560 Denis Meaney
561 Garry Russell
562 Arthur Summons
563 Ken Bray
564 Max Carter
565 Kevin Cocks
566 Bill Tonkin
 1961
567 John Hayes
568 Billy Martin
569 Don Parish
570 Kevin Smyth
571 John Rochester
572 Noel Kelly
573 Fred Norden
 1962
574 Gil MacDougall
575 Brian Henderson
576 Bob McGuinness
577 Don Hall
578 Carl Ross
579 Jim Cody
580 Wal Hinkley
 1963
581 Bob McLaughlin
582 Jack Gibson
 1964
583 Ken Owens
584 Ray Picklum
585 Dennis Laverty
586 John Armstrong
587 Ron Costello
588 Doug Page
589 Roy Ferguson
590 John Kearns
591 Brian Kowald
592 James Gibson
593 Pat Thomas
594 Denis Culpan
 1965
595 Noel Thornton
526 Dick Pickett
527 Denis Pittard
598 Jim Brophy
599 Graham Bevan
600 Bill Wilson
601 Bill Hansen
602 Barry Bryant
603 Peter Burnicle
 1966
604 John Elford
605 Alan Allison
606 John Walsh
 1967
607 Ken Stonestreet
608 Noel Dolton
609 Bob Smith
610 Doug Walkaden
611 Tony Ford
612 Barry Glasgow
613 Tony Packham
614 Peter Chapman
615 Ross Goodman
616 Bruce Beer
 1968
617 John Maxwell
618 Rod Smith
619 John Walsh
620 Mick Alchin
621 Neville Hornery
622 Tim Murphy
623 Steve Winter
624 John Baker
625 Peter Flanders
 1969
626 Gary Gunton
627 John Fisher
628 Frank Tagg
629 Don Rogers
630 Geoff Henry
631 Tommy Raudonikis
632 Walter James
633 Gary Weston
634 Jon Clark
 1970
635 Tony Antunac
636 Wayne Merry
637 Derek Brouwer
638 Jeff Nielsen
639 Kevin Timbs
640 Ivan Jones
 1971
641 Dick Timbs
642 Neville Sinclair
643 George Skeers
644 Russell Mullins
645 Noel Hurford
646 Russell Johnstone
647 Brian Winney
648 Barry Boss
649 Col Withers
650 Jim Croucher
 1972
651 John Heyward
652 Stephen Knight
653 John Walker
654 John O'Bryan
655 Olaf Prattl
656 John Sheridan
657 Steve Satterley
658 Allan Ashmore
659 Gary Rose
660 Peter Handcock
661 John Glachan
662 Geoff Foster
663 Terry Mullins
 1973
664 Shayne Day
665 Brian Isbester
666 Jim Murphy
667 Robbie Parker
668 Ted Walton
669 Nick Moroko
670 Jim Myers
671 Phil Franks
 1974
672 Dave Oliveri
673 John Purcell
674 Warren Snodgrass
675 Steve Rigney
676 Mick Liubinskas
677 John Dorahy
678 Pat Hundy
679 Graeme O'Grady
680 Russell Worth
681 Ron Giteau
682 Geoff Smith
 1975
683 John Donnelly
684 Terry Rose
685 Chris Wellman
686 Trevor Scarr
687 Ken Hey
688 Greg McTeigue
689 Peter Young
690 Trevor Reardon
 1976
691 Les Boyd
692 Wayne Smith
693 Peter Walsh
694 Steve Blyth
695 Geoff Gardiner
 1977
696 Doug Lucas
697 Gavin Miller
698 Don Moseley
699 Ken Bourke
700 Peter Rowles
701 Kerry Morrison
702 Bob Cooper
703 Alan Neil
704 Marshall Rogers
705 Garry Walsh
706 Steve Eisenhuth
707 Peter Lema
708 Dave Kennedy
 1978
709 Eric Cain
710 Bruce Gibbs
711 John Crow
712 Garry Clarke
713 Stephen Broughton
714 David Waite
715 Bill Cloughessy
716 Ron Brodrick
 1979
717 Warren Boland
718 Ray Brown
719 Jack Jeffries
720 Brian Cook
721 Mark Beaven
722 Gerard Crowe
723 Col Ensor
724 Pat Hurney
725 Terry Leabeater
726 Tony Armstrong
727 Peter Barr
 1980
728 Jeff Case
729 Ted Goodwin
730 Jim Leis
731 Paul Merlo
732 Wayne Buckley
733 John Ribot
734 Terry Lamb
735 Alan Latham
736 John McLeod
737 Tom Arber
738 Michael Duke
 1981
739 Garry Dowling
740 Ian Schubert
741 Greg Cox
742 Trevor Cogger
743 Garry Jack
744 Ross Conlon
745 George Moroko
746 Col Dennis
747 Bruce Clark
748 Mick Pinkerton
749 Geoff Spotswood
750 Trevor Ryan
 1982
751 Arthur Mountier
752 Bruce Grimaldi
753 George Fahd
754 Garry Collison
755 Brett Gale
756 Steve Anderson
757 Robert Ryan
758 Charlie Khalifeh
759 Greg McElhone
760 David Greene

 1983
761 Peter Burgmann
762 Ian Freeman
763 Scott Gale
764 David Hall
765 George Ghosn
766 Bill Hilliard
767 Brian Battese
768 Paul Gearin
769 John Cogger
770 Paul Beaven
771 Mark Massone
772 Mick Neil
773 Matt Carter
774 David Harris
775 Brett Davidson
776 Peter Lamb
777 Grant Fyvie
778 Allan Woods
779 Kevin Bryson
780 Bob Muirhead
 1984
781 Gerald Celarc
782 John Coveney
783 Pat English
784 Allen Geelan
785 Mark Harrigan
786 Craig Madsen
787 John McArthur
788 Gary Webster
789 Leo Epifania
790 Eddie Flahey
791 Darryl Turner
792 Craig Ellis
793 Gerry Byron
794 Steve Kerr
795 Scott Rigney
796 Brett Clark
797 George Katsogiannis
798 Allan Fallah
799 David Stafford
 1985
800 Greg Duval
801 Mark Lawson
802 Chris Stephandellis
803 Gary Warnecke
804 Mark Keehan
805 Craig Clarke
806 Steve Want
807 Wayne Wigham
808 Steve Ewer
809 Gary Pearce
810 Geoff Dillon
811 Steve Mullen
812 Tom Robbins
813 Lee Crooks
814 Peter Worth
815 Geoff Sutton
816 Greg Brown
817 Troy McGregor
818 Charlie Eltoubgi
819 Craig Neil
820 Greg Falkner
821 Gary McFarlane
 1986
822 Alan Burns
823 Paul Sheahan
824 Wilfred Williams
825 Brett Davis
826 Rod Pethybridge
827 John Bilbija
828 Ian Naden
829 Noel Mancuso
830 Grahame Jennings
831 Doug Rawlings
832 Deryck Fox
833 John Henderson
834 Des Drummond
835 John Elias
 1987
836 Phillip Duke
837 Wayne Lambkin
838 Steve McCoy
839 Les White
840 John Allanson
841 Scott Tronc
842 Terry Donnellan
843 Mark Meskell
844 Denis Kinchela
845 Hew Rees
846 Jason Williams
847 Andrew Stewart
 1988
848 Cameron Blair
849 Chris Blair
850 Gary Bukowski
851 Dave Gallagher
852 Dale Hall
853 Graham Mackay
854 Danny Peacock
855 Wayne Simonds
856 Mick Taylor
857 Craig Teitzel
858 Dave Woods
859 Michael Hoy
860 Ian Howcroft
861 Michael McClintock
862 Mark Bevan
863 Jason Stafford
864 Ernie Garland
865 Jason Lidden
866 Peter Vale
867 Michael McKinnon
868 Dave Wellings
869 Brian Brown
 1989
870 Stephen Funnell
871 Shane Leigh
872 Pat O'Doherty
873 Nick Stevanovic
874 Shane Flanagan
875 Michael Gould
876 Brendon Tuuta
877 Richard Smith
878 Darren Girard
879 Brett Docherty
880 Stuart Raper
881 Kelvin Skerrett
882 Ellery Hanley
883 Garry Schofield
884 Darren Britt
885 Stan Presdee
 1990
886 Tony Cosatto
887 Shaun Devine
888 Ivan Henjak
889 Steve Jackson
890 Bob Lindner
891 Jason Taylor
892 Jamie Ainscough
893 Tim Perrin
894 Graham Spinks
895 Angelo Alavanja
896 Russell Wyer
897 Chris Warren
898 Jason Kelly
899 Noel Goldthorpe
900 Paul Fuz
901 Shaun O'Bryan
 1991
902 Stephen Burns
903 Jim Dymock
904 Tony Rampling
905 Joe Thomas
906 Ron Gibbs
907 David Gillespie
908 Andrew Farrar
909 Graeme Wynn
910 Peter Trevitt
911 Reece Webb
912 Mark Williams
913 Bronko Djura
914 Robert Burgess
915 Paul Langmack
 1992
916 Mark Bell
917 Terry Hill
918 Darren Willis
919 Anthony Xuereb
920 Kyle White
921 David Anderson
922 Evan Cochrane
923 Billy Noke
924 Damien McGarry
925 Wayne Taekata
926 Stephen Kearney
927 Malcolm Wheeler
928 Jason Alchin
929 Scott Hardy
 1993
930 Justin Dooley
931 Steve Georgallis
932 Andrew Leeds
933 Steve O'Dea
934 Matt Ryan
935 Charlie Saab
936 Josh White
937 Andrew Willis
938 Justin Moloney
939 Brad Hughes
940 Darrien Doherty
941 Glenn Grief
942 Mark Afflick
943 Craig Menkins
944 Chris Williams
945 Brett Cullen
946 Jason Benge
947 Mark Hill
948 Aseri Laing
949 Gerome Lane
 1994
950 Darren Brown
951 Dale Fritz
952 Ewan McGrady
953 Jim Serdaris
954 Paul Smith
955 Brent Stuart
956 Neil Tierney
957 Manoa Thompson
958 Illiesa Toga
959 Jason Eade
960 Stuart Coupland
961 David Wonson
962 Brandon Pearson
963 Bill Dunn
964 Ciriaco Mescia
965 Ken McGuinness
966 Peter Shiels
 1995
967 Darren Burns
968 Damian Driscoll
969 Mark Horo
970 Damian Kennedy
971 Grant Trindall
972 Paul Bell
973 Tony Wall
974 Kevin McGuinness
975 David Myers
976 David Seidenkamp
 1996
977 Jason Austin
978 Craig Coleman
979 Jason Duff
980 Chad Harris
981 Darren Capovilla
982 Andrew Hick
983 Nathan Hodges
984 John Skandalis
985 Harvey Howard
986 Michael O'Neall
987 Willie Newton
988 Nathan Lakeman
 1997
989 Des Hasler
990 Shane Millard
991 Jimmy Smith
992 Shaun Walliss
993 Chris Yates
994 Adam Doyle
995 Adam Donovan
996 Shayne McMenemy
997 Brett Taylor
998 Brett Hodgson
999 Savenaca Lomanimako
1000 Gary Dowse
1001 Brett Hickman
 1998
1002 Scott Coxon
1003 Darren Rameka
1004 Leo Dynevor
1005 Adrian Rainey
1006 Don Smith
1007 Jason Keough
1008 Brenton Pomery
1009 Leo Clarke
1010 Nick Edwards
1011 Ben MacDougall
1012 Lincoln Raudonikis
1013 Dayle Bonner
1014 Ron Jones
1015 Brett Warton
1016 Darren Fritz
1017 Jared Mills
1018 Ashley Rhodes
1019 Darryl Fisher
1020 Travis Baker
1021 Aaron Cotter
1022 Trent Brown
 1999
1023 Adam Bristow
1024 Justin Brooker
1025 Paul Jeffries
1026 Robbie Payne
1027 Shane Perry
1028 Tevita Amone
1029 Dane Dorahy
1030 Luke Goodwin
1031 Marshall Scott
1032 Michael Brabek
1033 Matt Fuller
1034 David Buko
1035 Barry Davis
1036 Matt Spence
1037 Tate Moseley
1038 Chris Marland
1039 Ray Cashmere

Notable fans
 Doug Sutherland, mayor of Sydney (1980–87)
 Trooper Mark Donaldson VC
 Paul Gerantonis (1969 – current)
 Malcolm T. Elliott (radio broadcaster)
 John Singleton (entrepreneur, businessman and horse racing identity)
 Steve Waugh (former Australian Cricket captain)
 Ken Callander
 John Coates (Australian Olympic Committee chairman)
 Michael Clarke former Australian Cricket Captain

See also

 Wests Tigers

References

Further reading

External links

 Wests Archives Website details the history of the Western Suburbs Magpies and the Wests Tigers
 RL1908's Wests page
 Western Suburbs Page on the Rugby League Project Page

 
-
Defunct NSWRL/ARL/SL/NRL clubs
Ron Massey Cup
1908 establishments in Australia